A gridiron  is a metal grate with parallel bars typically used for grilling foods. Some designs involve two such grates hinged to fold together, securely holding food while grilling over an open flame.

Development
Early examples of the gridiron were found in Pompeii. The Latin term is "craticula", a diminutive form of "crates". This referred to their cross-hatched design, which appeared similar to a wicker basket, or crate. This is also used as the base for the word graticule, passing through French.

There were numerous iron gridirons manufactured and patented in the U.S. in the 1800s. These iron legged devices were used in a fireplace placed over the fire to cook food. Over time, gridirons have been developed specifically to accommodate the type of food being prepared and the cooking method being used. A combination hinged gridiron and spider was developed and patented in 1836 by Amasa and George Sizer of Meriden, Connecticut. A steel wire gridiron was developed and patented as early as 1889 in New Haven, Connecticut, by William C. Perkins, of the New Haven Wire Goods Co., who received a U.S. Patent #408,136 for a hinged gridiron that would hold the meat in place while broiling. A commercial hinged broiler or gridiron was designed for use in the Bridge & Beach, Co., 1898 vertical cast iron stove. This hinged broiler was manufactured by Luigi Pieragostini, also of the New Haven Wire Goods Co., and patented in 1939; U.S. Patent #2,148,879.

Today, hinged gridirons are used extensively to deep fry or broil fast food in restaurants throughout the world. Hot dog gridirons are also available for camping and outdoor cooking.

Cultural references 

A gridiron is essential to Chapter 28 of David Copperfield, where David, the Micawbers, and Traddles improvise a meal on one.  Charles Dickens mentions gridirons again as a suitable and practical gift that a blacksmith can make in his book Great Expectations, where he refers to their use for cooking sprats.

The American football and Canadian football fields originally resembled a gridiron, which produced a checkerboard effect, which influenced the term "gridiron football". The ball would be snapped in the grid in which it was downed on the previous play. By 1920, the grid system was abandoned in favor of the system of yard lines and hash marks used today.

In Christian iconography the gridiron is an attribute of Saint Lawrence of Rome.

Notes

References

Cookware and bakeware
Barbecue